Nurse's Song is the name of two related poems by William Blake, published in Songs of Innocence in 1789 and Songs of Experience in 1794.

The poem in Songs of Innocence tells the tale of a nurse who, we are to assume, is looking over some children playing in a field. When she tries to call them in, they protest, claiming that it is still light and therefore there is still time to play. The poem fits in with the theme of innocence, as it makes no mention of the negative aspects of playing outside; the children are oblivious of the dangers of playing outside late at night that would be considered in a modern society. The language uses various images associated with children's playing and imagination. The nurse is of a jovial and warm-hearted nature, as she allows the children to continue with their games, with no thought for the wider consequences. In his commentary, Sir Geoffrey Keynes wrote that one critic said that "few besides Blake could have written such a successful poem on the delight of being allowed to play a little longer until dusk".

The poem in Songs of Experience portrays the nurse in a different light: she is bitter, and fears the consequences of her actions. For critical interpretations of the poems, see here.

Notes

External links 

1789 poems
1794 poems
Songs of Innocence and of Experience